The 2013 Ohio Valley Conference baseball tournament was held from May 22 through 25.  The top six regular season finishers met in the double-elimination tournament, which was held at Pringles Park in Jackson, Tennessee.  The tournament champion will earn the conference's automatic bid to the 2013 NCAA Division I baseball tournament.

Seeding and format
The top six regular season finishers were seeded by conference winning percentage.  Teams then played a double-elimination tournament, with the top two seeds receiving a single bye.  Belmont claimed the third seed over Jacksonville State by tiebreaker.

Results

All-Tournament team
The following players were named to the All-Tournament team.

Most Valuable Player
Austin Peay infielder Reed Harper was named the tournament's Most Valuable Player.

References

Ohio Valley Conference Baseball Tournament
Ohio Valley Conference baseball tournament
Tournament
Ohio Valley Conference baseball tournament
Baseball in Tennessee
Sports in Jackson, Tennessee